Cross Island National Wildlife Refuge is a National Wildlife Refuge in the state of Maine.  It is one of the five refuges that together make up the Maine Coastal Islands National Wildlife Refuge, along with Petit Manan, Franklin Island, Seal Island, and Pond Island.

It is part of the Town of Cutler.

Islands
Cross Island National Wildlife Refuge consists of six islands:
 Cross Island - 
 Scotch Island - 
 Outer Double Head Shot - 
 Inner Double Head Shot - 
 Mink Island - 
 Old Man Island -

See also
 List of islands of Maine

References
Cross Island - Maine Coastal Islands National Wildlife Refuge

National Wildlife Refuges in Maine
Protected areas of Washington County, Maine
Islands of Washington County, Maine
Islands of Maine
Protected areas established in 1980
1980 establishments in Maine
Coastal islands of Maine